The 2023 Arkansas Razorbacks football team  will represent the University of Arkansas in the Western Division of the Southeastern Conference (SEC) during the 2023 NCAA Division I FBS football season. The Razorbacks are expected to be led by Sam Pittman in his fourth year as their head coach.

The Arkansas Razorbacks play their home games at Donald W. Reynolds Razorback Stadium in Fayetteville, Arkansas. They also have one game scheduled at War Memorial Stadium in Little Rock, Arkansas.

Previous season
The Razorbacks finished the 2022 season with an overall record of 6-6, 3-5 in SEC play to finish third in the West Division. Arkansas was invited to play in the 2022 Liberty Bowl on December 28 versus Kansas. Arkansas defeated the Jayhawks in a 3 OT thriller, 55-53, finishing the season with a 7-6 record. QB KJ Jefferson was named the bowl game MVP. 

LB Drew Sanders was named a consensus All-American for Arkansas, and was a finalist for the Butkus Award. LB Bumper Pool finished his career at Arkansas as the school's all-time leading tackler. Sanders, Pool, RB Raheim Sanders, C Ricky Stromberg, CB Dwight McGlothern, and S Hudson Clark were named to the All-SEC team.

Arkansas lost four games, Texas A&M, Liberty, LSU, and Missouri, by a grand total of 9 points.

Recruits
The Razorbacks signed a total of 19 recruits on the first day of the early signing period, December 21, 2022, all from high school for the 2023 Class. Arkansas also had 1 recruit who signed in the late signing period which began on February 1, 2023, for a total of 20 high school signees. 

Arkansas has also signed twelve transfers from the transfer portal for the 2023 Class. According to 247Sports, Arkansas has the #15 portal transfer class in the nation, On3.com ranks Arkansas' portal class at #7, and rivals.com ranks Arkansas' portal class at #20.

Schedule
Arkansas and the SEC announced the 2023 football schedule on September 20, 2022. The 2023 Razorbacks' schedule consists of 7 home games, 4 away games and 1 nuetral site game for the regular season. Arkansas will host three SEC conference opponents Auburn, Mississippi State and Missouri at home and will travel to four SEC opponents, Alabama, Florida, LSU and Ole Miss to close out the SEC regular season on the road. Arkansas will face Texas A&M in Arlington, Texas for the Southwest Classic at AT&T Stadium. Arkansas is not scheduled to play SEC East opponents Georgia, Kentucky, South Carolina, Tennessee and Vanderbilt in the 2023 regular season. The Razorbacks' bye week comes during week 9 (on October 28, 2023).

Arkansas's out of conference opponents represent the Big 12, CUSA, MAC and SoCon conferences. The Razorbacks will host all four of the four non–conference games which are against BYU from the Big 12, FIU from CUSA and Kent State from the MAC. The Razorbacks will host Western Carolina from the SoCon at War Memorial Stadium in Little Rock, Arkansas.

Coaching staff

^ - Dan Enos was Arkansas' OC from 2015 to 2017.

References

Arkansas
Arkansas Razorbacks football seasons
Arkansas Razorbacks football